College softball is softball as played on the intercollegiate level at institutions of higher education, predominantly in the United States. College softball is normally played by women at the Intercollegiate level, whereas college baseball is normally played by men. 

As with other intercollegiate sports, most college softball in the United States is played under the auspices of the National Collegiate Athletic Association (NCAA) or the National Association of Intercollegiate Athletics (NAIA). Over 600 NCAA member colleges are sponsors of women's softball programs. The women's softball championships are held in Division I, Division II, and Division III. The NCAA writes the rules of play, while each sanctioning body supervises season-ending tournaments. 

The final rounds of the NCAA tournaments are known as the Women's College World Series (WCWS); one is held on each of the three levels of competition sanctioned by the NCAA. The Division I Women's College World Series is held annually in June at USA Softball Hall of Fame Stadium in Oklahoma City near the site of the National Softball Hall of Fame.

The first first-ever WCWS was held in 1969 in Omaha, Nebraska, sponsored by the Amateur Softball Association and the Division of Girls' and Women's Sports. The first under NCAA auspices was held in 1982. The tournament now starts with 64 teams from 16 different regions that compete in a double-elimination regional round. The sixteen winners then enter a 'super regional', usually held at the higher seed's home ground, for a best-of-three series. The eight winners then enter a modified double-elimination tournament to determine which team is the national champion. Instead of being a 'true' double-elimination tournament, the tournament is split up so there are two brackets, though the losers switch brackets. The winners of each of the brackets move onto a best-of-three championship. The tournament is largely dominated by Pac-12 Conference teams, who have combined to win 21 of the 27 NCAA Division I championships through 2008, including 10 wins from the University of California Los Angeles (UCLA) and 8 from the University of Arizona.

In 2004 the International Softball Federation (ISF) held the first World University Softball Championship just two months after the 2004 Olympic competition. It was an eight country championship, with Team USA defeating Chinese Taipei for the gold medal. In 2006 the Fédération Internationale du Sport Universitaire (FISU) held the second World University Softball Championship in Taiwan, and in 2007 softball was added to the World University Games of FISU.

Junior College Softball 
The National Junior College Athletic Association was founded on May 14, 1938, and includes competition among junior college softball programs. Within the NJCAA there are Divisions I, II, and III, which are further divided into  regions and conferences. At the Division I level, there are 19 regions; at the Division II level, 18 regions; and at the Division III level, 9 regions. Every year at the end of the regional championships, national tournaments are conducted. The Division I tournament is held in St. George, Utah; the Division II tournament, in Clinton, Mississippi; and the Division III tournament, in Rochester, Minnesota.

See also

AIAW
AIAW Champions
Amateur Softball Association
Australian Softball Federation
College athletics
College rivalries
List of NCAA Division I softball programs
National Softball Hall of Fame and Museum
NCAA Division I softball tournament
Softball at the 1996 Summer Olympics
Softball at the 2000 Summer Olympics
Softball at the 2004 Summer Olympics
World University Softball Championship

References

External links
Amateur Softball Association
NCAA Women's Softball